Austin Bay is an Arctic waterway in the Kitikmeot Region, Nunavut, Canada. It is located in Dolphin and Union Strait, by southwestern Victoria Island. It is separated from the Coronation Gulf by a small peninsula.

Bays of Kitikmeot Region
Bays of the Arctic Ocean
Victoria Island (Canada)